Matatu: Journal for African Culture and Society is an academic journal on African literatures and societies dedicated to interdisciplinary dialogue between literary and cultural studies, historiography, the social sciences, and cultural anthropology. Published by Brill, Matatu is "committed to supporting democratic change in Africa, to providing a forum for interchanges between African and European critical debates, to overcoming notions of absolute cultural, ethnic, or religious alterity, and to promoting transnational discussion on the future of African societies in a wider world".

References

Literary magazines published in the Netherlands
Publications established in 1987
English-language journals
African literature
Brill Publishers academic journals
Mass media in Leiden